Dhak may refer to:

 Butea monosperma, also known as Palash, Flame of the Forest or Parrot Tree
 Dhak (instrument), a type of drum
 Dhaki, a person who plays the dhak  (instrument)
 Dhak railway station, in Punjab, Pakistan

See also